There are over 9,000 Grade I listed buildings in England. This page is a list of these buildings in the district of Dover in Kent.

Buildings

|}

See also
 Grade I listed buildings in Kent
 Grade I listed buildings in Ashford (borough)
 Grade I listed buildings in City of Canterbury
 Grade I listed buildings in Dartford (borough)
 Grade I listed buildings in Folkestone and Hythe
 Grade I listed buildings in Gravesham
 Grade I listed buildings in Maidstone
 Grade I listed buildings in Medway
 Grade I listed buildings in Tonbridge and Malling
 Grade I listed buildings in Tunbridge Wells (borough)
 Grade I listed buildings in Sevenoaks (district)
 Grade I listed buildings in Swale
 Grade I listed buildings in Thanet
 Grade II* listed buildings in Dover (district)

Notes

External links

Lists of Grade I listed buildings in Kent
Grade I listed buildings in Kent